Nationality words link to articles with information on the nation's poetry or literature (for instance, Irish or France).

Works

France
 Georges de Scudéry Œuvres poétiques ("Poetic Works"),
 Jean-Louis Guez de Balzac:
 Aristippe ou De la cour
 Le Prince, eulogy on King Louis XIII of France

Great Britain
 Charles Aleyn, The Battailes of Crescey, and Poctiers
Richard Braithwait:
 The English Gentleman
 The English Gentlewoman
 William L'Isle, The Faire Aethiopian, published anonymously; verse translation of Heliodorus, Aethiopica)
 David Lloyd, The Legend of Captain Jones, Part 1; published anonymously; attributed to Lloyd or, sometimes, to Martin Lluelyn (Part 2 in 1648)

Other
 Francisco de Quevedo, La aguja de navegar cultos con la receta para hacer Soledades en un día, satire attacking poets who use gongorino or culterano language, Spain, criticism

Births
Death years link to the corresponding "[year] in poetry" article:
 January 1 – Katharine Philips (died 1664), Welsh
 August 19 (Old style: August 9) – John Dryden (died 1700) influential English poet, literary critic, translator and playwright, who dominated the literary life of Restoration England to such a point that the period came to be known in literary circles as the Age of Dryden.
 October 18 – Michael Wigglesworth (died 1705), English Puritan minister and doctor, colonist in America called "the most popular of early New England poets"
 date not known – John Phillips (died 1706), poet and satirist, brother of Edward Phillips and nephew of John Milton

Deaths
Birth years link to the corresponding "[year] in poetry" article:
 February 4 – Bartolomé Leonardo de Argensola (born 1562), Spanish poet, writer and chronicler; brother of poet Lupercio Leonardo de Argensola
 February 7 – Gabriel Harvey (born c.1545), English poet and author
 March 31 – John Donne (born 1572), English poet, preacher
 December 23 – Michael Drayton (born 1563), English

See also

 Poetry
 16th century in poetry
 16th century in literature

Notes

17th-century poetry
Poetry